is a passenger railway station located in the city of Akashi, Hyōgo Prefecture, Japan, operated by the private Sanyo Electric Railway.

Lines

Station layout
The station consists of two unnumbered elevated side platforms connected by an underground passage. The station is unattended.

Platforms

Adjacent stations

|-
!colspan=5|Sanyo Electric Railway

History
Nakayagi Station opened on August 19, 1923.

Passenger statistics
In fiscal 2018, the station was used by an average of 1782 passengers daily (boarding passengers only).

Surrounding area
 Akashi Elephant Discovery Site 
 Byobugaura Beach 
 Hyogo Prefectural Akashi Josai High School

See also
List of railway stations in Japan

References

External links

 Official website (Sanyo Electric Railway) 

Railway stations in Japan opened in 1923
Railway stations in Hyōgo Prefecture
Akashi, Hyōgo